Nawan Pind Naicha is a village in Jalandhar district of Punjab State, India. It is located 9 km from Goraya, 12 km from Phillaur, 38 km from district headquarter Jalandhar and 125 km from state capital Chandigarh. The village is administrated by a sarpanch who is an elected representative of village as per Panchayati raj (India).

Transport 
Bhattian railway station is the nearest train station however, Phillaur Junction train station is 11.4 km away from the village. The village is 42 km away from domestic airport in Ludhiana and the nearest international airport is located in Chandigarh also Sri Guru Ram Dass Jee International Airport is the second nearest airport which is 129 km away in Amritsar.

References 

Villages in Jalandhar district